Chassy is a commune in the Saône-et-Loire department in the region of Bourgogne-Franche-Comté in eastern France.

History
It is in April, 1164, that Pope Alexandre III, taken refuge in France, gives a bull to the Abbey of Saint-Martin d'Autun, confirming the patronage of the church to the advantage of this abbey:" Ecclesiam de Chariaco ".

Liste of Mayor

1996-2008 : Jeanne Berlaud
Since 2008 : Simone Bonachi-Vezant

See also
Communes of the Saône-et-Loire department

References

Communes of Saône-et-Loire